Boys'  or Boy's Night Out may refer to:

Film and TV
 Boys' Night Out (film), a 1962 comedy
 Boys' Night Out (1996 film), starring Wil Wheaton

 "Boy's Night Out", an episode of the TV series Murphy's Law
 "Boy's Night Out", an episode of the TV series Benson

Music
 Boys Night Out (radio), an evening radio program on Filipino station Magic 89.9
 Boys Night Out (band), a Canadian emo/post-hardcore band
 Boys Night Out (album), their self-titled album
 "Boys' Night Out" (song), a song from the 1962 film, performed by Patti Page
 "Boys Night Out" (song), a single by Timothy B. Schmit
 "Boys' Night Out", a song from the Sammy Hagar's 1987 album, I Never Said Goodbye.